Wesley Steven Singerman (born August 23, 1990) is an American guitarist, record producer, songwriter and former child actor.

Early life
Singerman was born in Tarzana, California on August 23, 1990.

Career
As a record producer, songwriter and guitar player, Singerman has worked on releases by Kendrick Lamar, Ty Dolla $ign, and Rich Brian, among others. Singerman has announced that at some point, he will return to his voice acting career.

As an actor, Singerman is most recognized for his role in the 2007 Walt Disney Animation Studios' film Meet the Robinsons as Wilbur Robinson. He also voiced Charlie Brown in A Charlie Brown Valentine, Charlie Brown's Christmas Tales and Lucy Must Be Traded, Charlie Brown. After Meet the Robinsons, Singerman announced that he was retiring from his voice acting career to focus on music.

Filmography

Film

Television

Video Games

External links

American male child actors
American male film actors
American male voice actors
Living people
1990 births
People from Downingtown, Pennsylvania